Kowloon is an urban area that is part of Hong Kong.

Kowloon may also refer to:

Places

Kowloon, Hong Kong
Kowloon Peninsula, a peninsula that forms the southern part of the main landmass in the territory of Hong Kong
New Kowloon, an area in Kowloon
Kowloon City, an area in New Kowloon
Kowloon Bay (body of water), to the east of Kowloon
 Kowloon Bay (area)
Kowloon Central Post Office
Kowloon City District, one of the 18 districts of Hong Kong which encompasses Kowloon City, Kowloon Tong and other areas
Kowloon Tong, an area in Kowloon City District
Kowloon Hospital, a general care hospital at Argyle Street in Mong Kok
Kowloon Park, a public park in Tsim Sha Tsui
Kowloon Point
Kowloon Public Library
Kowloon Rock, an island in Kowloon Bay
Kowloon Shangri-La, one of two Shangri-La hotels in Hong Kong
Kowloon Tsai, between Kowloon City and Kowloon Tong
Kowloon Tsai Park, a park located in the Kowloon Tsai area of Kowloon
Kowloon Walled City, a former unique residential block

Other places in Hong Kong
Kowloon Peak, a mountain in the northeast corner of New Kowloon, in Ma On Shan Country Park
Cloudy Hill, also called Kowloon Hang Shan or Kau Lung Hang Shan, located in the Kau Lung Hang area
Kau Lung Hang, a village in Tai Po District, Hong Kong

Arts and entertainment
Kowloon Tong (novel), a novel by Paul Theroux
Kowloon Palace, a fictional location in the anime Street Fighter II V
Kowloon, a fictional location in the video game Digimon Story: Cyber Sleuth
Kowloon, a type of vampire from the manga and anime series Black Blood Brothers

Companies
Kowloon Dairy, one of the major dairy producers in Hong Kong
Kowloon Motor Bus (or KMB), the largest franchised bus operators in Hong Kong
Kowloon–Canton Railway (or KCR), a railway network in Hong Kong
Kowloon-Canton Railway Corporation (or KCRC), an assets holding company based in Hong Kong

Transport

Railway lines 
Kowloon Southern Link, a section of the MTR West Rail line, linking Nam Cheong station and East Tsim Sha Tsui station
East Kowloon line, one of the original five MTR lines proposed in the late 1970s in Hong Kong

Railway stations 
Kowloon station (MTR), a station on the Tung Chung line and the Airport Express of Hong Kong's MTR
Kowloon railway station (KCR), the former southern terminus of the Kowloon-Canton Railway. Not to be confused with Hung Hom station
Kowloon Bay station, a station on the Hong Kong MTR Kwun Tong line
Kowloon Tong station
Hong Kong West Kowloon railway station, a railway station on the West Rail line railway line in Hong Kong
Hung Hom station, formerly known as Kowloon station, on the East Rail line and West Rail line

Highways 
East Kowloon Corridor, part of the Route 5 highway
West Kowloon Corridor, part of the Route 5 highway
West Kowloon Highway, a section of the Route 3 highway

Other uses
Kowloon Bridge, a Bridge-class Ore-bulk-oil carrier that sank off the coast of West Cork, Ireland in 1986
Kowloon Restaurant, in Saugus, Massachusetts, described as America's largest Asian dining complex
Kowloon Technical School, a technical secondary school in Sham Shui Po, Kowloon, Hong Kong

See also
West Kowloon
九龍 (disambiguation)
Jiulong (disambiguation)